Gratiola brevifolia, commonly called sticky hedgehyssop, is a species of flowering plant in the plantain family (Plantaginaceae). It is found in the Southeastern United States, where it has a scattered distribution. Its natural habitat is in wet acidic areas.

Gratiola brevifolia is a rhizomatous perennial. Its leaves are linear-lanceolate with a few coarse teeth distally. Its flowers have white lobes and a yellow tube with brown lines. It blooms from April to September.

Gratiola brevifolia is similar to Gratiola vicidula, which has a range centered farther to the east. G. brevifolia can be distinguished by its narrower leaves and sepals. It is also similar to Gratiola ramosa, a species that it co-occurs with on the Southeastern Coastal Plain, from which G. brevifolia can be distinguished by the regular presence of 1-2 bracts subtending the sepals.

References

brevifolia
Flora of North America
Taxa named by Constantine Samuel Rafinesque